Mohamed Talis (born April 19, 1969) is a former Algerian international footballer. He spent the majority of his club career with ASO Chlef but had his most successful time with CR Belouizdad where he won the domestic league twice. At the international level, he had 3 caps for the Algeria national team from 1998 to 2001.

Talis is currently running a youth football association in Algiers.

Honours
 CR Belouizdad
 Algerian Championnat National: 1999–00, 2000–01
 Algerian League Cup: 2000

References

External links
 
 

1969 births
Algeria international footballers
Algerian footballers
ASO Chlef players
CR Belouizdad players
JSM Tiaret players
Living people
People from Chlef
RC Kouba players
Association football midfielders
21st-century Algerian people